Bismark Tetteh Nyarko (born 15 December 1973) is a Ghanaian politician who currently serves as the Member of Parliament for the Upper Manya Krobo Constituency.

References 

Living people
1973 births
National Democratic Congress (Ghana) politicians
Ghanaian MPs 2021–2025